The Vietnamese Airborne Division (Binh chủng Nhảy dù Việt Nam Cộng hòa) was one of the earliest components of the Republic of Vietnam Military Forces (Vietnamese: Quân lực Việt Nam Cộng hòa – QLVNCH). The Vietnamese Airborne Division began as companies organized in 1948, prior to any agreement over armed forces in Vietnam. After the partition of Vietnam, it became a part of the Army of the Republic of Vietnam. This division had its distinct origins in French-trained paratrooper battalions, with predecessor battalions participating in major battles including Dien Bien Phu and retained distinct uniforms and regalia. With the formation of an independent republic, the colonial paratroopers were dissolved, however regalia and aesthetics alongside the nickname "Bawouans" would be retained.

The Airborne Division, alongside the Vietnamese Rangers and the Marine Division were often regarded as among the most effective units, with former airborne advisor General Barry McCaffrey noting that "those of us privileged to serve with them were awestruck by their courage and tactical aggressiveness. The senior officers and non-commissioned officers were extremely competent and battle-hardened." Eight of nine battalions and three headquarters had earned US Presidential Unit Citation (United States) of which eight of these were earned by the Airborne between 1967-1968 which included the Tet Offensive period. Airborne commanders were often highly rated, with Airborne Commander Ngô Quang Trưởng once described by former Airborne-adviser and Gulf War commanding General Norman Schwarzkopf Jr. as "the most brilliant tactical commander I have ever known".

History
The Airborne Division had its origins in Indochinese-specific units raised under the "jaunissement" program, separating Indochinese members of French paratrooper units of the French Far East Expeditionary Corps forming separate battalions under the Vietnamese National Army. Among these includes the  1e BPVN, 3e BPVN and 5e BPVN who were airdropped into combat during the Siege of Dien Bien Phu. Most were killed afterward upon capture by the Viet Minh, who regarded them as traitors, rather than bargained as the French had been. They were later reformed into the Republic of Vietnam Military Forces and restructured upon the expulsion of the French by Ngo Dinh Diem following the Geneva Accords.

Vietnamese Airborne Division was among the elite fighting forces in the ARVN and placed as a reserve unit along with the Republic of Vietnam Marine Division. Headquarters of the Airborne Division was outside of Saigon. The Airborne Division would mobilize anywhere within the four corps at a moment's notice. The main use of the Airborne was to engage and destroy People's Army of Vietnam (PAVN) and Viet Cong (VC) forces, not hold a specific region like the infantry units.

On the afternoon of 10 June, 1965 during the Battle of Đồng Xoài, the 7th Airborne Battalion was landed in Đồng Xoài to reinforce the defenders in the camp. The following day the battalion marched 4km north into the Thuận Lợi rubber plantation where elements of the 1st Battalion, 7th Infantry Regiment, 2nd Division had been ambushed the previous day and they collected seven survivors and 55 bodies. In the afternoon, as elements of the battalion continued searching the plantation, the VC 271st Regiment started attacking them. Taking advantage of the poor weather conditions that had limited US airstrikes, as well as their numerical superiority, the VC broke the battalion into small groups and destroyed many of them. On 12 June, the strength of the 7th Airborne Battalion was reduced from 470 to just 159 soldiers.

On 11 December 1965 a United States Air Force (USAF) C-123B Provider #56-4376 crashed en route from Pleiku Air Base to Tuy Hoa Air Base killing all 4 USAF crewmen and 81 soldiers of the 7th Airborne Battalion on board. The remains of the crew and passengers were recovered, but the identities of the Airborne soldiers could not be established and they were kept at the Laboratory at Joint Base Pearl Harbor–Hickam for more than 30 years before being interred at the Vietnamese cemetery in Westminster, California in October 2019.

From 4–7 March 1966 the 1st and 5th Airborne Battalions participated in Operation Utah with the ARVN 37th Ranger Battalion and elements of the US 1st Marine Division fighting the PAVN 21st Regiment northwest of Quảng Ngãi.

From 20–25 March 1966 the 5th Airborne Battalion participated in Operation Texas with the ARVN 2nd and 3rd Battalions, 5th Regiment, 2nd Division and elements of the US 1st Marine Division fighting elements of the PAVN 21st Regiment and VC 1st Regiment around Hill 141 northwest of Quảng Ngãi.

On 4 August 1967 as part of Operation Greeley the 8th Airborne Battalion was deployed to aid the 1st Battalion, 42nd Regiment, 22nd Division which was locked in combat with a PAVN force on a hilltop west of Dak Seang Camp. After a three-day battle ARVN forces found 189 PAVN bodies, large quantities of ammunition and equipment, and a sophisticated regimental command post with training areas and an elaborate mock-up of the Dak Seang Camp.

1968
The Tết ceasefire began on 29 January 1968, but was canceled on 30 January after the VC/PAVN prematurely launched their Tet Offensive attacks in II Corps and II Field Force, Vietnam commander, LG Frederick C. Weyand deployed his forces to defend Saigon. General Cao Văn Viên, chief of the Joint General Staff, ordered the 8th Airborne Battalion, which was to deploy north to Quảng Trị Province, to remain at Tan Son Nhut Air Base and the Battalion participated in the defense of both the Tan Son Nhut Air Base and the Joint General Staff Compound. The 6th Airborne Battalion also late joined the fighting at the JGS Compound.

During the Battle of Hue, after resisting the initial PAVN/VC attacks on its Mang Ca Garrison headquarters on the morning of 31 January 1968, 1st Division commander General Ngô Quang Trưởng called in reinforcements including the 1st ARVN Airborne Task Force to relieve the pressure on Mang Ca. Responding to the call at PK-17 base 17 km north of Huế, the 3rd Troop and the 7th Battalion of the Airborne task force rolled out of their base area in an armored convoy onto Highway 1. A PAVN blocking force stopped the ARVN relief force about 400 meters short of the Citadel wall. Unable to force their way through the enemy positions, the Airborne asked for assistance. The 2nd Airborne Battalion then reinforced the convoy, and the ARVN finally penetrated the lines and entered the Citadel in the early morning hours of 1 February. The cost had been heavy: the ARVN suffered 131 casualties including 40 dead and lost four of the 12 armored personnel carriers in the convoy. The ARVN claimed to have killed 250 PAVN, captured five prisoners, and recovered 71 individual and 25 crew-served weapons. The ARVN would attempt to regain the Citadel while the Marines regained the new city south of the Perfume River. Within the Citadel the ARVN 1st Battalion, 3rd Regiment, and the 1st Airborne task force cleared out the north and western parts of the Citadel including Tây Lộc Airfield and the Chanh Tay Gate, while the 4th Battalion, 2nd Regiment moved south from Mang Ca towards the Imperial Palace, killing over 700 PAVN/VC by 4 February. On 5 February General Trưởng exchanged the Airborne with the 4th Battalion, which had become stalled. On 11 February the Vietnamese Marines Task Force A comprising the 1st and 5th Battalions, began to be lifted by helicopter into Mang Ca to replace the Airborne, however, due to poor weather this deployment would not be completed until 13 February. The ARVN Airborne had withdrawn from the eastern wall of the Citadel when the Vietnamese Marines began to arrive at Mang Ca and the PAVN defenders had used this opportunity to reoccupy several blocks and reinforce their defenses.

At the start of the Battle of Quang Tri on 31 January 1968 the 9th Airborne Battalion was deployed around Quảng Trị with one Airborne company bivouacked in Tri Buu village on the northern edge of the city with elements in the Citadel, and two Airborne companies positioned just south of the city in the area of a large cemetery where Highway 1 crosses Route 555. As the 600-man VC 814th Battalion, 324th Division was moving into position to attack Quảng Trị from the northeast, it unexpectedly encountered the 9th ARVN Airborne company in Tri Buu village, which engaged it in a sharp firefight lasting about 20 minutes. The Airborne company was nearly annihilated and an American adviser killed, but its stubborn resistance stalled the battalion's assault on the Citadel and the city. By 04:20, the PAVN's heavy pressure and overwhelming numbers forced the surviving Airborne soldiers to pull back into the city, and the 814th attacked and attempted to enter the Citadel unsuccessfully. At the same time the PAVN K6 Battalion, 812th Regiment encountered the Airborne forces in the cemetery south of the city preventing an attack on the ARVN 1st Infantry Regiment, 1st Division's La Vang Base. In the afternoon 2 companies of the US 1st Battalion, 5th Cavalry Regiment were landed southeast of Quảng Trị engaging the K6 Battalion from the rear in a heavy firefight, while Airborne troops blocked and attacked it from the direction of the city. US helicopter gunships and artillery hit the K6 Battalion hard causing significant further casualties. By nightfall on the 31st, the battered 812th Regiment decided to withdraw, though clashes continued throughout the night. Quảng Trị was clear of PAVN/VC troops by midday on 1 February, and ARVN units with U.S. air support had cleared Tri Buu Village of PAVN troops. The remnants of the 812th, having been hit hard by ARVN defenders and US airpower and ground troops on the outskirts of the city, particularly artillery and helicopters broke up into small groups, sometimes mingling with crowds of fleeing refugees, and began to exfiltrate the area, trying to avoid further contact with Allied forces. Between 31 January and 6 February, the Allies killed an estimated 914 PAVN/VC and captured another 86 in and around Quang Tri.

From 11 March to 7 April 1968 the Division participated in Operation Quyet Thang in Gia Định Province with the Marine Brigade and the US 199th Light Infantry Brigade to reestablish South Vietnamese control over the areas immediately around Saigon in the aftermath of the Tet Offensive. On 26 March, east of Hóc Môn Airborne forces found 128 dead VC who had apparently been killed by air and artillery strikes while moving south towards Saigon.

From 8 April to 31 May 1968 the 1st Airborne Task Force participated in Operation Toan Thang I to continue pressure on PAVN/VC forces in III Corps. The operation involved nearly every combat unit in III Corps. The operation was a success with allied forces claiming 7645 VC/PAVN killed, however, the operation did not prevent the VC/PAVN from launching their May Offensive attacks against Saigon.

From 20 April to 12 May 1968 the 6th Airborne Battalion participated in Operation Delaware with the US 1st Cavalry Division.

During the May Offensive at 10:00 on 5 May the Airborne was engaged by VC north of Tan Son Nhut Air Base.

On 13 September 1968 during the Phase III Offensive, the VC 3rd Battalion, 272nd Regiment attacked Firebase Buell II. After a 600 round mortar barrage, the infantry attacked the base but were easily repulsed leaving 76 dead for no U.S. losses. The VC retreated west taking refuge in a hamlet southwest of Tây Ninh where they were engaged late that day by the 2nd Airborne Battalion who killed 150 VC for the loss of 9 dead and 17 wounded. After midnight on 20 September the 1st Battalion, 272nd Regiment, attacked a Regional Forces outpost in Phước Tân hamlet, 20km west of Tay Ninh City, losing 35 killed in the brief assault. The 1st Marine Battalion was deployed to Phước Tân later that day to defend against any renewed assault. That evening the 271st Regiment attacked, the assault was repelled with air and artillery support, killing 128 VC with 6 captured. The 8th Airborne Battalion was also deployed to Phước Tân and on the night of 27 September the 272nd Regiment attacked again losing 150 killed.

From 3 December 1968 the 2nd Airborne Task Force participated in Operation Goodwood under the operational control of the 1st Australian Task Force. On 15 January 1969 the 1st Marine Battalion replaced the 2nd Airborne Task Force.

1969-71
In June 1969 the new II Field Force, Vietnam commander Lt. Gen. Julian Ewell initiated the Dong Tien (or "Progress Together") Program with III Corps commander, General Đỗ Cao Trí, to "buddy up US and ARVN units to conduct combined operations [that would]... maximize the effectiveness of both forces [and] achieve in 2, 3, or 4 months a quantum jump in ARVN and RF/PF performance." The Airborne, now a complete nine-battalion division with three regimental and one division headquarters, artillery and supporting services, was still part of the general reserves under the supervision of the Joint General Staff, Saigon had never employed the force as an entire division and was still parceling it out in small multi-battalion task forces that continued to suffer more than their share of wear and tear. In contrast, other elements of the Airborne force, including the division headquarters and many of the support units, had seen little action in the field, rarely moving from their Tan Son Nhut base camp.

Something had to be done to revitalize this key unit that would someday have to serve as the mobile reserve force for the entire country, and in October 1969 General Ewell nominated the US 1st Cavalry Division for the task. Since its arrival in III Corps in late 1968, the 1st Cavalry Division had been operating along the sparsely populated Cambodian border, engaging regular PAVN forces that ventured south across the frontier. Although the division had conducted a number of minor combined operations with assorted ARVN units, it had remained aloof from the main Dong Tien Program. However, the reduced amount of PAVN activity along the border during the second half of 1969 enabled Ewell to expand the missions of the airmobile unit.

In October and November representatives of II Field Force and III Corps met in a series of meetings at General Trí's Bien Hoa headquarters, and laid out the ground rules for the Cavalry-Airborne Dong Tien operation. Trí emphasized the need for close coordination of commands and staffs at the division and brigade/regimental levels but felt that integrated operations at the battalion level were unnecessary. Presumably, the Airborne battalions were experienced enough to take care of themselves, but the Airborne brigade and division staffs needed much work. The Cavalry would have to make helicopters available and supply certain airmobile and communications equipment that the Vietnamese lacked. With these exceptions, the Vietnamese were to be in charge of their own operations, including their logistical needs.

Trí also wanted the Airborne Division to establish a forward headquarters with a full tactical operations center alongside the US division headquarters. Almost immediately the 2nd Airborne Brigade moved into War Zone C along the Cambodian border for combined operations with the 1st Cavalry Division's 1st Brigade. Operating from Tây Ninh City, the two Brigade commanders opened fire support bases across War Zone C for the three participating Airborne battalions. The ARVN bases, each housing one Airborne battalion, and a supporting artillery battery were staggered between 1st Brigade firebases, making US artillery support readily available. Initially, the commanders matched each Airborne battalion with a Cavalry unit, and Cavalry personnel gave Airborne troops and their advisers' elementary instruction in combat air assaults, extractions, and resupply. But the Cavalry units had relatively little to do with the day-to-day ground operations of the Airborne. Each Airborne battalion had its own area of operation and, supported by helicopters of the US 11th Combat Aviation Group, constantly patrolled their jungle zones. In December the Cavalry's 2nd Brigade began a similar program with the 1st Airborne Brigade east of War Zone C, in the Phước Bình border area. General Ewell reinforced the Vietnamese and advisory communications systems with US forward observers, special liaison teams, and extra radios. This assistance, together with the overlapping artillery support and the close proximity of US airmobile infantry battalions, ensured that he could quickly aid the Vietnamese units should strong enemy forces be encountered, but despite Ewell's concern, such occasions never arose, and the Airborne operations were relatively uneventful.

After several months in the field, General Trí rotated other airborne units through the 1st Cavalry Division's "training area" until the program ended in April 1970. The effort was a mixed success. As in similar programs, American air, communications, and logistical support enabled the South Vietnamese units to run extended operations well beyond their normal supply and support capabilities. However, the Airborne never operated as an entire division. Because the division commander, General Đống, failed to establish a tactical command post and rarely took to the field, his staff and support units benefited little. Americans still considered Đống a problem child and felt that the Airborne had significant weaknesses that Dong Tien had been unable to address. Nevertheless, the combined effort set the stage for more ambitious undertakings in Cambodia one month later.

On 1 May 1970 as part of Operation Toan Thang 43 (Total Victory), an early phase of the Cambodian Campaign, the 3rd Airborne Brigade together with other US forces crossed into Kampong Cham Province of Cambodia. The Airborne played a significant role in the campaign, with battalions participating in most of the individual operations and finding significant caches of supplies, alongside being the sole force dropped behind enemy lines to cut-off a potential retreat.

From 8 February to 25 March 1971 the 2nd Airborne Battalion and the 3rd Airborne Brigade Headquarters and the 3rd Airborne Battalion participated in Operation Lam Son 719. The two battalions developed firebases along Route 9 in Laos to serve as tripwires for any PAVN advance into the zone of the ARVN incursion. On 23 February the PAVN began shelling the 3rd Battalion's Fire Support Base 31. Airborne Division commander General Đống had opposed stationing his elite paratroopers in static defensive positions and felt that his men's usual aggressiveness had been stifled. Vicious PAVN anti-aircraft fire made reinforcement and resupply of the firebase impossible. General Đống then ordered elements of the 17th Armored Squadron to advance north from A Loui to reinforce the base. The armored force never arrived, due to conflicting orders that halted the armored advance several kilometers south of FSB 31. On 25 February the PAVN deluged the base with artillery fire and then launched a conventional armored/infantry assault. Smoke, dust, and haze precluded observation by an American forward air control (FAC) aircraft, which was flying above  to avoid anti-aircraft fire. When a U.S. Air Force F-4 Phantom jet was shot down in the area, the FAC left the area of the battle to direct a rescue effort for the downed aircraft crew, sealing the fate of the base. PAVN troops and tanks then overran the position, capturing the ARVN brigade commander in the process. FSB 31 was secured by the PAVN at an estimated cost of 250 killed, and 11 PT-76 and T-54 tanks destroyed. The Airborne had suffered 155 killed and over 100 captured. the 2nd Battalion at Fire Support Base 30 lasted only about one week longer. Although the steepness of the hill on which the base was situated precluded armored attack, the PAVN artillery bombardment was very effective. By 3 March the base's six 105mm and six 155mm howitzers had been put out of action. In an attempt to relieve the firebase, ARVN armor and infantry of the 17th Cavalry moved out to save their comrades. Following the conclusion of the operation the Airborne were kept in I Corps instead of returning to their base in Saigon, presumably to prevent them spreading stories of the losses suffered in the operation.

Easter Offensive

In late February 1972 in response to intelligence reports of a PAVN buildup including tanks and artillery in the Central Highlands, the 2nd Airborne Brigade was placed under the control of II Corps and deployed to secure a string of firebases along a backbone of mountains stretching south-west from Tân Cảnh Base Camp towards Kontum nicknamed Rocket Ridge. In the first week of March another Airborne Brigade and the Division's tactical command post were deployed to defend Kontum city and the south of Kontum Province, these were the last available reserves in South Vietnam.

On the morning of 3 April Firebase Delta 25km northwest of Kontum, defended by one company of Airborne and one of Rangers came under attack by the PAVN 52nd Regiment, the assault was repulsed using intensive tactical airstrikes and the PAVN suffered 353 killed. On 21 April the PAVN launched an assault on Firebase Delta by 3 tanks supported by infantry and by the evening had succeeded in overrunning the base. From 23 to 24 April the PAVN overran the main ARVN bases at Tân Cảnh and Đắk Tô Base Camp. With the loss of these camps, the remaining firebases along Rocket Ridge were abandoned and the PAVN had a clear approach to Kontum.

During the Battle of An Lộc on 15 April 1972, the 1st Airborne Brigade was lifted by helicopters into An Lộc to support the besieged garrison. After the initial direct assaults on the town had been repulsed, the PAVN bombarded the town and gradually reduced the defensive line, while all the time being battered by US and South Vietnamese airstrikes. On 11 May the PAVN 5th and 9th Divisions launched a massive all-out infantry and armor assault on An Lộc, suffering severe losses to airstrikes but further squeezing the defenders. Another assault on 12 May failed to take the city. The PAVN launched a final attack on 19 May in honor of Ho Chi Minh's birthday. The attack was broken up by U.S. air support and an ambush by the Airborne. After the attacks of 11 and 12 May the PAVN directed its main efforts to cut off any more relief columns. However, by 9 June this proved ineffective, and the defenders were able to receive the injection of manpower and supplies needed to sweep the surrounding area of PAVN and by 18 June the battle was over and the 1st Airborne Brigade was released to Division command.

Following the defeat of the ARVN in Quảng Trị Province in the initial phase of the Easter Offensive, on 2 May 1972 the remnants of the 3rd Division, the 147th and 258th Marine Brigades and the 1st Division established a new defensive line along the Mỹ Chánh River northwest of Huế. On 3 May I Corps commander General Hoàng Xuân Lãm was replaced by Lieutenant General Ngô Quang Trưởng, commander of IV Corps and this change of command and reinforcement by forces of the general reserve stabilized the ARVN position in Thừa Thiên Province. The remained of the Marine Division was deployed to Huế and was given responsibility for north and northwest Thừa Thiên Province, while the 1st Division was given responsibility for the area southwest and south of Huế blocking any further PAVN advance from the A Sầu Valley. On 8 May the 2nd Airborne Brigade arrived at Huế and came under the operational control of the Marine Division on the My Chanh Line. The entire Division arrived in late May and was given responsibility for a sector between the Marine Division and the 1st Division.

From 11 to 18 June the Division and the Marine Division conducted probing attacks to test PAVN strength ahead of the launch of General Trưởng's Operation Lam Son 72 to recapture Quảng Trị Province. The operational plan called for the Airborne and Marine Divisions to advance abreast to the northwest to the Thạch Hãn River. The Division would deploy to the west from the foothills to Highway 1, while the Marine Division would deploy to the east from Highway 1 to the coast. Quảng Trị City would be in the Division's operational area, but the plan called for the city to be bypassed so as to concentrate on the destruction of PAVN forces. On 28 June the South Vietnamese advance began and quickly ran into strong PAVN resistance and helicopter assaults were launched to land troops behind PAVN positions. By 7 July the Division had reached the southern outskirts of Quảng Trị City, but then-President Thieu intervened in the operation. Trưởng had planned to bypass the city and push on quickly to the Cua Viet River, thereby isolating any PAVN defenders. Thiệu, however, now demanded that Quảng Trị be taken immediately, seeing the city as "a symbol and a challenge" to his authority. The Division's assault bogged down in the outskirts and the PAVN, apprised of the plans for the offensive, moving the 304th and 308th Divisions to the west to avoid the U.S. airpower that was about to be unleashed upon Quảng Trị. On 27 July, the Marine Division was ordered to relieve the Division as the lead element in the battle. The citadel was finally captured on 15 September.

In 1972 President Thiệu finally moved General Đống out of the Division which he had commanded since September 1964, appointing him to command the Capital Military District and replacing him with General Le Quang Luong who had performed well at An Lộc.

From August to 3 November 1974 the 1st and 3rd Airborne Brigades fought the PAVN 304th Division in the Battle of Thượng Đức. The Airborne lost 500 dead and more than 2,000 wounded, severely weakening the strength of this elite unit at a crucial time, while PAVN casualties were estimated to exceed 7,000 and the 304th Division was rendered combat ineffective.

1975

In late December 1974 General Trưởng took advantage of the temporary calm to pull the 2nd Airborne Brigade out of the line west of Huế, placing it in reserve in Phú Lộc District.

The initial PAVN attacks in Quảng Trị Province struck Regional Force outposts and strongpoints in the foothills and the hamlets of the coastal lowlands. By 8 March, PAVN and local VC were in control of seven hamlets in Hải Lăng District and in southern Quảng Trị and northern Thừa Thiên Provinces, and refugees streamed southward, until nearly the entire population of Quảng Trị Province, as many as 100,000, traveled the road to Huế. With tanks and armored personnel carriers, an ARVN task force composed of the 8th Airborne Battalion, the 112th and 120th RF Battalions, and the 921st RF Company, succeeded in driving the enemy from nearly all populated areas by afternoon on 9 March. PAVN/VC casualties were heavy and ARVN losses few in this opening phase.

On 11 March a battalion of the PAVN 6th Regiment infiltrated through Phú Lộc, and two of its companies seized 12 fishing boats, which ferried them across Dam Cau Hai Bay to Vinh Loc Island. There they attacked Vinh Hien Village on the southern tip of the island and swept north to attack Vinh Giang. Some of the battalion pushed into Phu Thu District east of Huế. The 8th Airborne Battalion, reinforced with two companies of the 1st Battalion, 54th Infantry, and a troop of armored cavalry, moved against the PAVN battalion and badly mauled and dispersed it. On the same day, PAVN artillery-supported infantry assaults were launched against the 3rd Division, Airborne Division and territorial positions from Đại Lộc to Quế Sơn. Nearly all these assaults were repelled with heavy PAVN losses.

On 12 March, General Trưởng received the JGS order to pull the Airborne Division out of the line and start it moving to Saigon. The deployment was to begin on 17 March. General Trưởng immediately called General Viên to protest the decision but learned that President Thieu had personally directed the deployment so that the Airborne Division could participate in the offensive to retake Ban Me Thuot. General Viên told General Trưởng that, if possible, two battalions of the new 468th Marine Brigade and a Ranger group would be sent north to replace the Airborne Division. To adjust to the loss of the Airborne Division, General Trưởng decided to pull the Marine Division out of Quảng Trị and northern Thua Thien Provinces and shift it south to cover Phú Lộc District and Da Nang. I Corps was to defend Huế and Da Nang, even if it had to give up Quang Tri, Quang Tin, and Quang Ngai Provinces. General Trưởng and General Thi agreed, however, that their ability to hold Huế after the Marine Division moved south was questionable indeed. General Truong flew to Saigon on 13 March to participate in a secret meeting with President Thiệu, Prime Minister Trần Thiện Khiêm and General Viên during which Trưởng was told about the evacuation from the Central Highlands and ordered to prepare a plan for the eventual evacuation of I Corps. He also was permitted to delay the first airborne brigade's departure to 18 March and the rest of the division until 31 March. Thiệu's reasoning was that Da Nang was most important, but that the rest of the region could be sacrificed. He would send the 468th Marine Brigade north to help defend Da Nang as soon as the Airborne Division arrived in Saigon. This division was vital to the defense of III and IV Corps, without which South Vietnam could no longer survive.

On 15 March, the 14th Ranger Group was to begin the relief of the 369th Marine Brigade in Quảng Trị Province. While one marine brigade would remain in the Song Bo Valley for the defense of Hue, the 369th Marine Brigade would deploy to Đại Lộc District in Quảng Nam Province, and relieve the 3rd Airborne Brigade for movement to Saigon.

On 17 March the 258th Marine Brigade pulled out of Quảng Trị to relieve the 2nd Airborne Brigade in southern Thừa Thiên and on 18 March the 2nd Airborne Brigade moved to the Da Nang docks for shipment to Saigon.

While the entire division was to move the Saigon, the 3rd Airborne Brigade was diverted at Nha Trang and sent to support the 23rd Division blocking the PAVN advance at Khanh Duong.The 3rd Airborne Brigade dug in on the high ground in the Cả Pass, behind the 40th Regiment. When the PAVN 10th Division supported by tanks forced their way through the 40th Regiment at Khanh Duong the Airborne held their positions. On 30 March the PAVN 10th Division supported by the 40th Artillery Regiment and with two companies of tanks attached, attacked the Airborne positions. On 31 March elements of the 28th and 66th Regiments, the next day surrounded the 5th Airborne Battalion which was reduced by casualties to 20 percent strength. The 3rd Airborne Brigade was deployed in depth
from Chu Kroa Mountain south for about 15km along the high ground over the Route 21. Heavy PAVN fire knocked out 5 of 14 armored personnel carriers supporting the brigade, and the three 105mm. howitzer batteries in the force had to move to the rear, setting up near Buon Ea Thi, beyond supporting range of the forward Airborne positions. The collapse of the Airborne defense proceeded very rapidly afterward. At Buon Ea Thi elements of the 10th Division outflanked Airborne positions along the road and struck the 6th Airborne Battalion. Although the troopers knocked out three T-54 tanks, they could not hold. With the brigade split at Buon Ea Thi, a rapid withdrawal was imperative to conserve what was left of the decimated force. The 3rd Airborne Brigade, less than one-fourth of its soldiers still in ranks, marched back through Dục Mỹ Camp and Ninh Hòa and stopped in a narrow defile where Route 1 edged along the beach below Han Son Mountain, just north of Nha Trang with the 10th Division close behind. On 1 April, PAVN tanks rolled through Dục Mỹ and Ninh Hòa and headed for Nha Trang. The II Corps staff drove south to Phan Rang Air Base, the defeated remnants of the Airborne, Rangers, Regional and Popular Forces, and 40th Regiment followed. The RVNAF evacuated Nha Trang Air Base at 15:00 and all flyable aircraft were flown out. On the morning of 3 April the RVNAF at Phan Rang launched a heliborne operation comprising more than 40 UH-1s and 6 CH-47s escorted by A-37s to rescue the remnants of the 2nd, 5th and 6th Airborne Battalions that had been cut off at the M'Đrăk Pass successfully evacuating over 800 soldiers.

From 7 to 8 April the 2nd Airborne Brigade flew into Phan Rang to replace the remnants of the 3rd Airborne Brigade which moved back to Saigon. On 8 April the 3rd Airborne Battalion cleared Highway 1 and recaptured the villages of Bà Râu and Ba Thap from the VC and the 11th Airborne Battalion then deployed by helicopters to recapture Du Long town and the Du Long Pass, meanwhile the 5th Airborne Battalion secured the area around Phan Rang AB and cleared Route 11. On 11 April the 5th Airborne Battalion was withdrawn to Saigon and on 12 April the rest of the 2nd Airborne Brigade was ordered to withdraw to Saigon. On 13 April the 31st Rangers arrived by air from Bien Hoa while the ARVN 4th and 5th Regiments of the reformed 2nd Division arrived by road from Phan Thiết to replace the Airborne. The 31st Rangers deployed to Du Long to replace the 11th Airborne Battalion on the evening of 13 April. The PAVN meanwhile had decided to eliminate Phan Rang and at 05:30 on 14 April the PAVN 3rd Division began an artillery attack on the 31st Rangers at Du Long Pass and the 3rd Airborne at Bà Râu. At 06:30 PAVN tanks and infantry attacked to 31st Rangers' position but were forced back. At 07:00 2 A-37s accidentally bombed the Rangers. The PAVN then bypassed the Rangers and attacked Du Long Town quickly defeating the Regional Forces there and outflanking the 31st Rangers at the pass. Reinforcements from the 52nd Rangers were sent to support the 31st Rangers but they were unable to break through and at 16:00 the 31st Rangers were ordered to withdraw with only 80 Rangers successfully returning to Phan Rang AB. At the same time as the attack on Du Long, the PAVN 25th Regiment infiltrated to attack Phan Rang AB. Despite helicopter gunship fire they successfully penetrated the base and headed for the hangar area where they were met by the 11th Airborne Battalion awaiting transport back to Saigon and 4 M113 armored personnel carriers which together with air support from the helicopter gunships and A-37s forced the PAVN back outside the perimeter, killing over 100 for the loss of 6 ARVN killed and 1 M113 destroyed. At dawn on 15 April the PAVN shelled the 3rd Airborne Battalion at Bà Râu and Kien Kien on Route 1 and then attacked their position. Although outnumbered, the Airborne held back the assault until midday when it blew the highway bridge and then withdrew onto Ca Dau mountain to the east. At 02:00 on 16 April an RVNAF EC-47 intercepted a PAVN radio transmission indicating an armored attack on Phan Rang would start at 05:00. A-37 aircraft were launched to attack PAVN positions along Route 1 and at 03:00 reconnaissance reported a large PAVN force moving through the Du Long Pass. Meanwhile, VC forces began attacking the base perimeter and on Ca Dau Mountain. At 05:00 the PAVN artillery bombardment commenced and this was soon followed by an armored spearhead of 20 tanks and armored personnel carriers of the 4th Battalion, 203rd Tank Brigade supported by truck-mounted infantry of the 101st Regiment and anti-aircraft guns. While the lead tank was destroyed by an ARVN rocket, the PAVN force quickly cut through the 3rd Airborne platoon holding Kien Kien. The RVNAF at the base mounted numerous airstrikes on the armored column destroying vehicles, taking losses from the antiaircraft fire and by 08:00 the armored vehicles were on the outskirts of the city. However the truck-mounted infantry had dispersed to avoid the airstrikes and the anti-aircraft vehicles had not kept up with the advance, leaving the 101st Regiment vulnerable to further air attacks which destroyed or damaged another 16 vehicles and killing numerous PAVN soldiers. The PAVN 3rd Division then attacked the Airborne troops on Ca Dau Mountain and allowed the 101st Regiment to resume its advance. After overcoming a Regional Force roadblock on the outskirts of the city for the loss of 2 tanks and many infantry, the PAVN pushed into the city capturing the Provincial Headquarters. By 09:30 the PAVN had captured the port and a bridge on Route 1 south of the city sealing off all sea and land escape routes. At 08:45 a battalion-sized PAVN mechanized force attacked along Route 11 towards the base. While one element attacked the 5th Regiment defending Route 11, the other moved around it to attack the base directly and at the same time, the 25th Regiment attacked the north of the base. The 5th Regiment soon broke and ran allowing the PAVN to attack the base's main gate while the 25th Regiment penetrated the north perimeter with explosives and captured the bomb storage area. The Airborne attempted a counterattack against the 25th Regiment but were forced back and then squeezed between the PAVN and by 09:30 the PAVN had captured the base. At midnight on 17 April, the Airborne attacked a PAVN force on Route 11, but in the confusion of the attack LG Nghi and his command group became separated and at 02:00 were captured by the PAVN.

On 11 April the 1st Airborne Brigade was deployed south of Xuân Lộc District and began moving north to support the 18th Division fighting the Battle of Xuân Lộc. The Brigade made slow progress against a determined PAVN defense and on 19 April the JGS ordered that a general withdrawal from Xuân Lộc. The Brigade withdrew through the plantations and jungles toward Bà Rịa in Phước Tuy Province, where it would defend until South Vietnam capitulated.

Airborne brigade and divisional commanders
Đỗ Cao Trí (1954-1955)
Nguyễn Văn Vỹ 
Cao Văn Viên (1960-1964)
Nguyễn Khánh
Dư Quốc Đống
Nguyễn Chánh Thi (1955-1960)
Nguyễn Khoa Nam
Đoàn Văn Quảng
Lê Quang Lưỡng

Structure and organization

Airborne Advisory Detachment
Like all major ARVN units the Airborne was assigned a U.S. military advisory element, originally the Airborne Brigade Advisory Detachment, and later redesignated the 162nd Airborne Advisory Detachment or U.S. Airborne Advisory Team 162. About 1,000 American airborne-qualified advisors served with the Brigade and Division, receiving on average two awards for valor per tour; over the years, they were able to build and maintain a good working relationship with their Vietnamese counterparts and airborne units, a situation unfortunately not always found in other ARVN formations. U.S. officers were paired with their Vietnamese counterparts, from the Brigade/Division commander down to company commanders, as well as with principal staff officers at all levels. U.S. NCOs assisted the staff and company advisors.

Units
 Colonial units
 1st Indochinese Parachute Company (1ére CIP)
 3rd Indochinese Parachute Company (3e CIP)
 5th Indochinese Parachute Company (5e CIP)
 7th Indochinese Parachute Company (7e CIP)
 1st Airborne Guard Company (1ére CPGVN)
 3rd Vietnamese Parachute Battalion (3e BPVN)
 5th Vietnamese Parachute Battalion (5e BPVN)
 6th Vietnamese Parachute Battalion (6e BPVN)
 7th Vietnamese Parachute Battalion (7e BPVN)
 3rd Vietnamese Parachute Engineers Company (3ére CPGVN)
Airborne Group units
 Headquarters & Headquarters Company (HHC)
 1st Airborne Battalion (1 TDND)
 3rd Airborne Battalion (3 TDND)
 5th Airborne Battalion (5 TDND)
 6th Airborne Battalion (6 TDND)
 Airborne Combat Support Battalion
 Airborne Brigade units
 Headquarters & Headquarters Company
 1st Task Force HQ
 1st Airborne Battalion (1 TDND)
 6th Airborne Battalion (6 TDND)
 7th Airborne Battalion (7 TDND)
 2nd Task Force HQ
 3rd Airborne Battalion (3 TDND)
 5th Airborne Battalion (5 TDND)
 8th Airborne Battalion (8 TDND)
 Airborne Combat Support Battalion
 Airborne Division units
 Headquarters Battalion
 U.S. Airborne Advisory Team 162
 1st Task Force/Brigade HHC
 1st Airborne Battalion (1 TDND)
 8th Airborne Battalion (8 TDND)
 9th Airborne Battalion (9 TDND)
 1st Airborne Artillery Battalion
 2nd Task Force/Brigade HHC
 5th Airborne Battalion (5 TDND)
 7th Airborne Battalion (7 TDND)
 11th Airborne Battalion (11 TDND)
 2nd Airborne Artillery Battalion
 3rd Task Force/Brigade HHC
 2nd Airborne Battalion (2 TDND)
 3rd Airborne Battalion (3 TDND)
 6th Airborne Battalion (6 TDND)
 3rd Airborne Artillery Battalion
 4th Task Force/Brigade HHC
 4th Airborne Battalion (4 TDND)
 10th Airborne Battalion (10 TDND)
 Division Troops
 Airborne Signal Battalion 
 Airborne Support Battalion 
 Airborne Medical Battalion 
 Airborne Reconnaissance Company/Battalion 
 Airborne Engineer Company/Battalion

Weapons and equipment
The South Vietnamese airborne forces used the standard weaponry and equipment of French and U.S. origin issued to ANV and ARVN units. Paratrooper companies also fielded crew-served heavy weapons, such as mortars and recoilless rifles, whilst divisional artillery batteries were provided with Howitzers.

M1917 revolver
Smith & Wesson Model 10 Revolver
MAS-35-S pistol (7.65mm Longue) 
Colt.45 M1911A1 pistol 
Smith & Wesson Model 39 Pistol 
MAT-49 Submachine gun
M1A1 Thompson submachine gun 
M3A1 Grease Gun 
M1A1 Carbine
M2 Carbine
M1 Garand rifle
MAS-36 Bolt-action rifle
M16A1 Assault rifle 
CAR-15 Assault carbine
FM 24/29 light machine gun 
M1918A2 BAR Light machine gun 
M60 machine gun 
Browning M1919A4 .30 Cal Medium machine gun 
Browning M2HB .50 Cal Heavy machine gun 
M72 LAW Anti-tank rocket launcher
M79 grenade launcher
M2 mortar 60 mm
M19 mortar 60 mm
M29 mortar 81 mm
Brandt mle 27/31 mortar 81 mm
M67 recoilless rifle 90 mm
3.5 inch M20A1 Super Bazooka 
M101A1 105mm towed field howitzer
M102 105mm light towed field howitzer
Hurricane Aircat Airboat patrol boat

See also
 ARVN
 Army of the Republic of Vietnam Special Forces (LLDB)
 First Indochina War
 MIKE Force
 Republic of Vietnam Military Forces
 Royal Lao Army Airborne
 Vietnamese National Army (ANV)
 Vietnam War
 Weapons of the Vietnam War

References

Further reading
Martin Windrow and Mike Chappell, The French Indochina War 1946-1954, Men-at-arms series 322, Osprey Publishing Ltd, Oxford 1998. 
Michael N. Martin, Angels in Red Hats: Paratroopers of the Second Indochina War, Goshen, KY: Harmony House Publishers, 1995. ,

External links
 The War: Belfries & Red Berets
 Angels in Red Hats by General Barry R. McCaffrey
 The Vietnamese Airborne Division and Their Advisors
 Red Berets of South Vietnam Video
 Family photos of Red Berets

A
Airborne divisions
Military units and formations established in 1948
Military units and formations disestablished in 1975